Harry Smith (27 October 1887 – 24 August 1916) was an Australian cricketer. He played four first-class cricket matches for Tasmania from 1907–08 to 1914–15 and one match for Victoria in 1912–13.

See also
 List of Victoria first-class cricketers
 List of Tasmanian representative cricketers

References

External links
 

1887 births
1916 deaths
Australian cricketers
Tasmania cricketers
Victoria cricketers
Cricketers from Launceston, Tasmania